Nischintapur is a common village name in Bangladesh, West Bengal and elsewhere in India, it may refer to:

 Nischintapur, Budge Budge, a census town in South 24 Parganas district of West Bengal, India
 Nischintapur, Howrah, a village in Howrah district of West Bengal, India
 Nischintapur, Kulpi, a village in South 24 Parganas district of West Bengal, India